Keith Wright (born June 8, 1980) is a former American football defensive tackle. In 2012, Wright was found guilty on 19 charges including armed robbery, kidnapping, forced oral copulation, first degree burglary, and false imprisonment, and was sentenced to a 234 years and 8 months prison sentence.

Biography
Wright graduated at 17 and went to Arizona Western college, where he stayed for 2 years before moving on to Sacramento City College in 1999. There, he had a total of 14 sacks during one season. Later he had 68 tackles his first season at Missouri. Then, he was moved to defensive tackle at the Missouri team, and he was able to complete 92 tackles in 2002. With that, he expected to be chosen in the third or fourth round of the 2003 NFL Draft.

Wright was drafted by the Texans as the final pick of the sixth round of the 2003 NFL Draft. He signed a contract worth $925,000 for the seasons from 2003 to 2005.

On November 10, 2003, Wright was signed as a free agent from the Texans practice squad by the Indianapolis Colts.

On November 24, 2004, Wright was signed by the Tampa Bay Buccaneers to their practice squad and released on July 27, 2005.

The Arizona Cardinals signed Wright to a one-year contract on August 5, 2005, but subsequently released him on August 29.

The Buccaneers signed him as a free agent in January 2006 and assigned him to NFL Europe. He was released on September 2, 2006, and signed to the Detroit Lions practice squad on October 18.

On August 29, 2011, Wright was arrested on suspicion of home invasion and sexual assault in the Natomas neighborhood of Sacramento, California. He was linked to three home invasions that took place in July and August 2011. During one of them, he sexually assaulted a woman and forced her to pull money out of two ATMs.

In October 2012, Wright was convicted on 19 charges including armed robbery, kidnapping, forced oral copulation, first degree burglary, and false imprisonment. On November 30, he was sentenced to 234 years and 8 months in prison.

Sources
 Sportsnet biography
 Career transactions

References

1980 births
21st-century American criminals
Living people
Players of American football from California
American football defensive tackles
Missouri Tigers football players
Hamburg Sea Devils players
Sportspeople from Santa Clara, California
American people convicted of burglary
American people convicted of kidnapping
American people convicted of sexual assault
American sportspeople convicted of crimes
Prisoners and detainees of California
American expatriate sportspeople in Germany
American expatriate players of American football
Sacramento City Panthers football players
Arizona Western College alumni
Criminals from California
Tampa Bay Buccaneers players